Tunjŏn station is a railway station in Sudong District, South Hamgyŏng Province, North Korea. It is located on the P'yŏngra Line of the Korean State Railway, and is the starting point of the Kowŏn Colliery Line.

References

Railway stations in North Korea
Buildings and structures in South Hamgyong Province